Monotoma longicollis is a species of root-eating beetle in the family Monotomidae. It is found in Africa, Australia, Europe and Northern Asia (excluding China), North America, and Southern Asia.

References

Further reading

External links

 

Monotomidae
Articles created by Qbugbot
Beetles described in 1827